KKBJ-FM (103.7 FM), known on-air as "Mix 103.7", is a radio station based in Bemidji, Minnesota, that airs a Top 40 (CHR) format.

The station previously had a Top 40 (CHR) format as B-103, "Today's Best Music" and flipped to adult contemporary as Mix 103.7 in 1994, after being sold to RP Broadcasting. The station switched to hot adult contemporary format a few years later. In recent years, the station began evolving to a Top 40 (CHR). The station plays the Daily Download with Carson Daly every Saturday morning and Backtrax USA and the American Top 40 with Ryan Seacrest every Sunday.

External links
Mix 103.7 KKBJ-FM official website

Radio stations in Minnesota
Contemporary hit radio stations in the United States
Radio stations established in 1986
1986 establishments in Minnesota